Géza Gulyás (5 June 1931 – 14 August 2014), was a Hungarian football goalkeeper who was a member of the Hungary national team at the 1954 FIFA World Cup. However, he was never capped for his country. He also played for Ferencvárosi Torna Club.

References

Obituary

External links
 FIFA profile

1931 births
Footballers from Budapest
Hungarian footballers
Association football goalkeepers
1954 FIFA World Cup players
2014 deaths
Ferencvárosi TC footballers